Vishnu Vardhan (born 27 July 1987), also known as J. Vishnuvardhan, is a professional tennis player from India. He won bronze medal in men's doubles at 2010 Asian games in Guangzhou, China. He paired-up with and Sania Mirza for mixed doubles and won silver medal at the same event. He was featured as ITF player of April 2011. He won the national singles title for the fourth time by winning the Men's final of Fenesta Open tennis Championship on October 8, 2016

Personal life 
Vishnuvardhan's father Mr Jagadeesan is a businessman. He started playing at the age of 9 and was greatly inspired by Leander Paes.  He did his schooling from DAV Safilguda Hyderabad.

Career
Vishnuvardhan was considered a promising prospect for Indian tennis, representing the next generation of the sport in the country and succeeding Leander Paes and Mahesh Bhupathi. He has represented India in the Davis Cup and was part of the team that defeated Uzbekistan and Philippines en route to qualifying for the World Group.

Vishnuvardhan began to show glimpses of his talent right from a young age, performing well on the junior circuit. The year 2003 proved to be his defining year on the junior circuit with Vishnuvardhan winning the Junior Nationals, and earning himself a place in the Indian Junior Davis Cup team. This success on the junior circuit translated itself into glory in Inter-University tournaments as well, with Vishnuvardhan capturing the gold medal in successive tournaments as the team captain.

Vishnuvardhan has won the Grass Court Nationals and achieving a career-high national ranking of two.

J.Vishnuvardhan won this first futures tournament on 11 July.

In 2012, Vishnu won the Zuari Garden City-ITF against Sriram Balaji 7–6(7), 6–3.

Vishnu won the Toyota Bangalore Open ITF in June 2012 by defeating Ti-Chen of Chinese Taipei 6–2, 4–6, 6–1.

Vishnu participated in the 2012 London Olympics in the Men's Doubles category partnering Leander Paes. Vishnu and partner Leander Paes crashed out of the Olympic doubles after a 7–6 (7/3), 4–6, 6–3 defeat against French Jo-Wilfried Tsonga and Michaël Llodra. Vishnu won the national singles title for the fourth time by winning the Men's final of Fenesta Open tennis Championship on October 8, 2016, by defeating left-hander Siddharth Vishwakarma from Varanasi 6–3, 6–4. For the year of 2018, Vishnu is focusing on doubles by partnering with Sriram Balaji with a goal of playing at the Wimbledon.

Challenger and Futures finals

Singles: 24 (10–14)

Doubles: 76 (42–34)

See also
Tennis at the 2010 Asian Games

References

External links
 
 
 

1987 births
Living people
Asian Games medalists in tennis
Indian male tennis players
Racket sportspeople from Hyderabad, India
Tennis players at the 2012 Summer Olympics
Olympic tennis players of India
Tennis players at the 2010 Asian Games
People from Secunderabad
Asian Games silver medalists for India
Asian Games bronze medalists for India
Medalists at the 2010 Asian Games
South Asian Games gold medalists for India
South Asian Games medalists in tennis